The Madagascar spinetail, Madagascan spinetail  or Malagasy spinetail (Zoonavena grandidieri) is a species of swift in the family Apodidae.
It is found in Comoros, Madagascar, and Mayotte.

References

Madagascar spinetail
Birds of the Comoros
Birds of Mayotte
Birds of Madagascar
Madagascar spinetail
Taxonomy articles created by Polbot